Freddy Fadi Ibrahim (born October 14, 1996) is  a Jordanian-Canadian basketball player for the Al Ahli Club of the Jordanian Premier League "JPL" and the Jordanian National team. He is considered one of the best point guards of the league.

College career
Ibrahim played college basketball for the Tampa Spartans of the University of Tampa, In his first year he averaged 2.0 points, 1.4 rebounds and 1.1 assists per game. In his sophomore year, he averaged 5 points, 3.1 rebounds and 3.7 assists per game. In his junior year, he averaged 4.2 points, 2.6 rebounds and 2.8 assists per game. He averaged 10.2 points, 4.5 rebounds and 3.1 assists per game in his senior year.

Professional career
Ibrahim joined the Jordanian side Orthodox Basketball Club in the 2019-20 season.

National team career
Ibrahim played for the Jordanian national team at William Johns Cup in Taiwan and the 2019 FIBA Basketball World Cup in China, where he averaged 7.2 points, 2.4 rebounds and 3.4 assists per game.

References

External links
Tampa Spartans bio

1996 births
Living people
2019 FIBA Basketball World Cup players
Basketball people from Ontario
Canadian expatriate basketball people in the United States
Canadian people of Jordanian descent
Jordanian men's basketball players
Sportspeople from Mississauga
Tampa Spartans men's basketball players